Margaret Dicksee or Margaret Isabel Dicksee (22 January 1858 – 6 June 1903) was a British painter.

Dicksee was born in London as the daughter of the painter Thomas Francis Dicksee. Her brother Frank Dicksee also became a painter. Dicksee showed her works at the Royal Academy from 1883.

Her paintings In Memoriam and The Child Handel were included in the 1905 book Women Painters of the World.

References

Footnotes

Sources
Margaret Isabel Dicksee on artnet

1858 births
1903 deaths
Painters from London
British women painters
19th-century British painters
19th-century British women artists